P'umpu Q'asa (Quechua p'umpu tumor, swelling, to swell; congestion, q'asa mountain pass, Hispanicized spelling Pumpujasa) is a  mountain in the Wansu mountain range in the Andes of Peru. It is located in the Arequipa Region, La Unión Province, Huaynacotas District. P'umpu Q'asa lies southeast of Kimsa Chata and Puka Urqu.

References 

Mountains of Peru
Mountains of Arequipa Region